Crazy Joe is a 1974 crime film directed by Carlo Lizzani and produced by Dino De Laurentiis. The Italian-American co-production is a fictionalized retelling of the murder of Joseph "Crazy Joe" Gallo, a mobster who was gunned down on April 7, 1972, at a restaurant in Little Italy. The screenplay by Lewis John Carlino is based on a series of articles by journalist Nicholas Gage. The film stars Peter Boyle in the title role, with Paula Prentiss, Fred Williamson, Rip Torn, Luther Adler, Henry Winkler and Eli Wallach.

Plot
In New York City, hot-tempered gangster Joe Gallo pulls a knife on a man in a theater who complains about Joe's talking during the movie. Joe later enters a car with his brother Richie and cronies Jelly and Mannie. They don masks, pull guns and perform a mob assassination at a restaurant.

Joe and Richie are offended when their boss Falco does not invite them into his home when they arrive for payment of their crime. Falco pays them just $100 each for the job. They crash through the gates of his stately lakeside mansion and take Falco's brother and others prisoner. Don Vittorio, the head of all New York crime families, settles the dispute. Falco agrees to reward Joe and Richie in the future, but he double-crosses them, his thugs nearly strangling Richie to death before burying Jelly in cement.

Coletti, who also betrayed Joe and Richie, takes over Falco's operations after the terminally ill Falco dies inside an iron lung. Richie is also ill, suffering from a stomach ailment. His brother is set up, cops catching him red-handed as he tries to extort a merchant. Joe is sent to prison, where he befriends Willy, a black inmate, and helps Willy instigate a prison riot over the prison's unjust conditions. Joe is glad to have a new ally, particularly with the terminally ill Richie committing suicide by driving a car off a cliff.

As soon as Joe gets out of jail, he returns to New York and the woman in his life, Anne, then begins building his crime organization with the help of Willy and Harlem associates. "Crazy Joe" becomes a notorious figure in New York, known for his temper but also for his colorful associations around town.

Joe has a confrontation with Coletti and vows to avenge the betrayal that landed him behind bars. But before he can, Don Vittorio beats him to it. Upset with an Italo-American federation Coletti has organized that attracted unwanted attention to the crime families, Don Vittorio arranges for Coletti to be assassinated at a rally and for Joe to be blamed.

Anne pleads with Joe to leave town, and an angry Willy needs to be convinced that Joe wasn't the one responsible for Coletti's murder. When he and Willy go to Don Vittorio's home to discuss the situation, Joe threatens the mob boss rather than believe his offer to work together. Vittorio immediately puts out a contract on Joe, and at a restaurant where he, Anne and Willy are having dinner, gunmen turn up and open fire, both men ending up dead.

Cast 

 Peter Boyle as Joe Gallo
 Paula Prentiss as Anne
 Fred Williamson as Willy Bates
 Eli Wallach as Don Vittorio Giovanni
 Rip Torn as Richie Gallo
 Charles Cioffi as Joe Coletti
 Luther Adler as Danny Falco
 Carmine Caridi as Jelly
 Henry Winkler as Mannie
 Sam Coppola as Chick
 Franco Lantieri as Nunzio
 Louis Guss as Magliocco 
 Fausto Tozzi as Frank
 Guido Leontini as Angelo
 Mario Erpichini as Danny
 Michael V. Gazzo as Sal
 Adam Wade as J.D.
 Hervé Villechaize as Samson
 Gabriele Torrei as Cheech
 Peter Savage as DeMarco
 Tony Lip as Andy
 Jay Rasumny as Clyde Barrow

Production
According to Variety, the screenplay for Crazy Joe was based on a series of articles on mafia wars by The New York Times reporter Nicholas Gage. Director Carlo Lizzani stated that the reason he made the film was because he felt that Gallo's story was a mirror image of a character who was "typical of the '68 movements. Gallo was a young Mafioso who gathered the young against the old, just as it happened in China in the name of Mao and in the rest of the world as well." Lizzani went on that "What's more - a sacrilegious thing in the Mafia - he made a pact with the Black Panthers, an interracial alliance! I could choose ten other different stories, I could do whatever I wanted and I had the money to do it, but for these reasons I chose to do Crazy Joe. It was a parable that symbolized a season of our contemporary society."

Martin Scorsese was initially going to be Lizzani's assistant on the film, while Lizzani's original choice for the role of Gallo was going to be Robert De Niro, after seeing him in Bloody Mama. Filming began on 25 June 1973, and took place entirely on location in New York City.

Release
Crazy Joe was distributed theatrically in Italy by Cineriz on 8 February 1974. The film grossed a total of 628,266,000 Italian lire domestically. Italian film historian and critic Roberto Curti described the film a "commercial failure" in Italy, noting that it grossed less than "mediocre genre products such as Kidnap, despite a sturdy cast". The credits of the Italian version of the film are largely incomplete, and differ from the credits of the American version; for instance, the former version credits Dino Maiuri, Massimo De Rita and Lizzani with the screenplay, while the latter credits Lewis John Carlino as the sole screenwriter. The Italian version also does not credit an editor, who is identified as Peter Zinner in the American version.

The film opened in New York on 15 February 1974. It was distributed by Columbia Pictures in the United States. The Daily Variety reported that on same date, Barry Slotnick, a lawyer for Mafia member Joseph Colombo intended to file an injunction against Crazy Joe.  This involved a claim that the character of Coletti was based on Colombo, which violated his "right of privacy." Colombo was comatose during this period after being shot in the head in June 1971. Daily Variety reported on 26 Feb 1974 that a New York Supreme Court judge ruled against the injunction, as the film was not an invasion of Colombo's privacy.

Reception
From a contemporary review, Vincent Canby found that the film presented the "ins and outs of Mafia family wars [as] difficult to follow as pre-World War I Balkan politics, though not quite so fascinating." Canby continued that Peter Boyle played Joe as if he were a "dim‐witted numbers runner", and that casting Paula Prentiss as his girl was "one of the minor mysteries of the movie year. Could she have wandered onto the wrong set?"

See also
 List of Italian films of 1974
 List of American films of 1974

Notes

References

External links

1974 films
Biographical films about gangsters
Films directed by Carlo Lizzani
Films set in New York City
Films shot in New York City
Films set in 1972
Italian crime films
American crime films
Films about the American Mafia
American biographical films
Italian biographical films
English-language Italian films
Films produced by Dino De Laurentiis
Colombo crime family
1970s English-language films
1970s American films
1970s Italian films